Sołtmany  is a village in the administrative district of Gmina Kruklanki, within Giżycko County, Warmian-Masurian Voivodeship, in northern Poland.

On 30 April 2011, the place witnessed the fall of a stony meteorite.

References

Villages in Giżycko County